Huancabamba Province is a landlocked province in the Piura Region in northwestern Peru. The province is the easternmost in the region.

Boundaries
North Ecuador
East Cajamarca Region
South Lambayeque Region
West Ayabaca Province

Political division

Huancabamba
Canchaque
El Carmen de la Frontera
Huarmaca
Lalaquiz
San Miguel de El Faique
Sondor
Sondorillo

Population
The province has an approximate population of 125,000 residents.

Capital
The capital of the province is the city of Huancabamba.

This province is famous by Waringa Lake (Laguna de Huaringas).

See also
Piura Region
Peru

References 

Provinces of the Piura Region